Portland Hotel Society (PHS) is a Canadian non-profit society created in 1993 to provide advocacy, housing, services, and opportunities, for Vancouver's Downtown Eastside. Its 451 staff support 1,153 rooms, North America's first legal supervised-injection site, known as Insite, a Downtown Eastside credit union branch (Pigeon Park Savings), a food service that feeds people in Single-Room Occupancy residences (Downtown Eastside Central Kitchen) and a pest control service (Bugs Be Gone).

In 1991, the Downtown Eastside Residents Association (DERA) converted a local hotel to housing for homeless people and named it after the American city of Portland, Oregon due to its reputation for aiding homeless people.

A co-founder of the society was former Vancouver city councilor Jim Green.

Housing
As of 2019, PHS operates over 24 supportive housing facilities across Vancouver and Victoria for community members who have experience with mental illnesses, challenges with substance use, a history of homelessness, past experience with the criminal justice system and other encounters with oppressive or structural violence. The program is funded by the BC Housing Management Commission (a provincial Crown corporation) and the Vancouver Coastal Health Authority. Approximately 40 percent of residents remain in PHS housing for about 10 years, while the balance of residents stay 4 to 6 years. This contrasts dramatically with the prior history of residents, who typically registered 6 to 8 addresses – or none at all – in the year before moving to the Portland Hotel.

It currently operates several buildings owned by BC Housing, including the Washington Hotel, the Rainier Hotel, the Roosevelt Hotel, the Beacon Hotel and the Sunrise Hotel.

Insite
In September 2003, the PHS forced Vancouver Coastal Health to found Insite by constructing and opening the site illegally. Insite became North America's first supervised injection site. The Government was forced through the pressure of public opinion to issue a special exemption to the Controlled Drugs and Substances Act.

On August 13, 2007, the Portland Hotel Society and two citizens filed suit in the BC Supreme Court to keep the centre open, arguing that its closure by the federal government would be a violation of the Charter right of Insite users to "security of the person".

On September 29, 2011, the Supreme Court of Canada ruled unanimously in Canada (AG) v PHS Community Services Society that the federal government's failure to renew Insite's exemption under the Controlled Drugs and Substances Act was arbitrary, undermining the very purposes of the CDSA, which include public health and safety.  It is also grossly disproportionate: the potential denial of health services and the correlative increase in the risk of death and disease to injection drug users outweigh any benefit that might be derived from maintaining an absolute prohibition on possession of illegal drugs on Insite's premises. The Court ordered the federal government to grant an exemption to Insite forthwith, allowing the facility to stay open. Although the Court noted the government could later withdraw this exemption, "where [...] the evidence indicates that a supervised injection site will decrease the risk of death and disease, and there is little or no evidence that it will have a negative impact on public safety, the [government] should generally grant an exemption."

Governance

According to filings with Revenue Canada, PHS revenue for 2013 exceeded $35.5 million, with 61 percent provided by the provincial government of British Columbia. For that year, management costs accounted for nine percent of expenses. In 2013, six full-time employees received compensation between $120,000 and $159,000.

In early 2014, the provincial minister responsible for housing Rich Coleman disclosed that an external audit by accounting firm KPMG found concerns about administration costs. 

As a result of the audit's findings, the nine-member board and (husband and wife) co-executive directors Mark Townsend and Liz Evans resigned in March 2014.  Replacement board members included Vancouver Coastal's former CEO Ida Goodreau and current Chief Medical Health Officer Patty Daly.

References

External links 
Photo Archive by PHS Community Services
PHS Community Services Society Profile on HealthLinkBC
Home page of PHS Community Services Society
Shared Learnings: On Homelessness, Portland Hotel Society

Organizations based in Vancouver
Organizations established in 1993
Health charities in Canada
Downtown Eastside